In mathematics, Legendre moments are a type of image moment and are achieved by using the Legendre polynomial.  Legendre moments are used in areas of image processing including: pattern and object recognition, image indexing, line fitting, feature extraction, edge detection, and texture analysis.  Legendre moments have been studied as a means to reduce image moment calculation complexity by limiting the amount of information redundancy through approximation.

Legendre moments 
With order of m + n, and object intensity function f(x,y):
 

where m,n = 1, 2, 3, ... with the nth-order Legendre polynomials being:

which can also be written:

where D(n) = floor(n/2). The set of Legendre polynomials {Pn(x)} form an orthogonal set on the interval [−1,1]:

A recurrence relation can be used to compute the Legendre polynomial:

f(x,y) can be written as an infinite series expansion in terms of Legendre polynomials  [−1 ≤ x,y ≤ 1.]:

See also

 Image moment
 Legendre polynomial
 Zernike polynomials

References 

Computer vision
Orthogonal polynomials
Polynomials
Special hypergeometric functions